Aly Monroe is a British writer of historical thrillers set in the 1940s. She was brought up in Purley, England. She has spent a large part of her life in Spain, where she worked as a teacher, translator and voice-over artist. She is the author of the Peter Cotton series of historical novels, including Icelight which won the 2012 Ellis Peters Historical Award.

Bibliography
Monroe's series character is Peter Cotton who works for the British intelligence service. Her first novel, The Maze of Cadiz, is set in Spain, where Monroe lived for many years. The second novel, Washington Shadow, was set in Washington, DC and shortlisted for the CWA Ellis Peters Historical Fiction Award. The third novel of the series, Icelight, won the CWA Ellis Peters Historical Award.

Novels
 The Maze of Cadiz (2008)
 Washington Shadow (2009)
 Icelight (2011)
 Black Bear (2013)

Notes

External links
 Official website
 Reviews at EuroCrime
 Aly Monroe talks to CrimeTime about Icelight

English women novelists
Living people
English spy fiction writers
People from Leicester
Year of birth missing (living people)